The Right Reverend Noble McNeely was the Moderator of the Presbyterian Church in Ireland from 2017 until 2018.

Early life and education 
Born in Belfast, McNeely was brought up in Crossgar, Co Down. He studied teaching at  Stranmillis College from 1972 to 1976 and taught high school for two years. He obtained his Bachelor of Divinity degree at Union Theological College in 1981.

Career 
He was licensed in Lissara Presbyterian Church (1981) and ordained as Assistant Minister in Fisherwick Presbyterian Church in 1982. He was called to First Ballymoney Presbyterian Church in 1984 and in 1997 he became Minister of First Holywood Presbyterian Church.

McNeely became Moderator of the General Assembly on 5 June 2017. In February 2018 Charles McMullan was elected as moderator-elect to succeed McNeely, to take office in June 2018.

References 

Year of birth missing (living people)
Living people
Moderators of the Presbyterian Church in Ireland
Presbyterian ministers from Northern Ireland